Tara Lee (born Tara Lisa) is an Irish actress, singer and songwriter. She is signed to BMG Chrysalis. In 2018, Lee appeared in EastEnders as Jessica Jones for four episodes. As well as her work in television, Lee has also worked in film.

Filmography

Discography

Singles

References

External links 
 

1994 births
21st-century Irish women singers
Irish women songwriters
Irish actresses
Living people
Actresses from Dublin (city)